Montague Gardens is an industrial area in Cape Town with a population of only 22 residents.

Neighbouring suburbs include Milnerton Ridge, Milnerton, Edgemead, Bothasig and Summer Greens.

References

Suburbs of Cape Town